Xylorycta apheles is a moth in the family Xyloryctidae. It was described by Turner in 1898. It is found in Australia, where it has been recorded from New South Wales and Queensland.

The wingspan is 21–22 mm. The forewings are whitish-grey, sparsely irrorated with grey and fuscous at the base, then ochreous, whitish almost to the apex. There is an ill-defined grey triangular blotch on the centre of the inner-margin, its oblique posterior edge very distinct. There is an ill-defined greyish line from the costa at three-fourths to before the anal angle, gently outwardly curved in the disc. The hindwings are grey.

References

Xylorycta
Moths described in 1898